Shailesh Datar (Shailesh Dattar) is an Indian film, television and stage actor, who started in Marathi theatre and television. He is best known for playing role of sage Narada in the mythological TV series Devon Ke Dev...Mahadev  (2012). Prior to it he gained popularity while playing the role of Moropant Tambe, the father of Rani Lakshmibai in TV series, Jhansi Ki Rani (2009 -2011) and in Baba Aiso Varr Dhoondo as the female lead's father, the shows rerun is telecasted on Dangal Tv(2010-2012). He has acted in TV series include, Bandhan Saat Janamon Ka (2008-2009), Aan, Main Teri Parchhain Hoon, Banoo Main Teri Dulhan (2006-2009), and Char Divas Sasuche (2005) on ETV Marathi.

He is also known for his role as Ravsaheb, in Marathi play Barrister, written by Jaywant Dalvi and directed by Vikram Gokhale. He also did role of Amatya Ugrasen in Colors TV serial Chakravartin Ashoka Samrat.

Filmography
Ladhaai (1999)
Bhulwa (2007) as Police Inspector Shivraj Patil

Television shows

Char Divas Sasuche, ETV Marathi
Asambhav (2007-2008) as Balkrishna Shastri, Zee Marathi
Main Teri Parchhain Hoon (2008-2009) as Ravikant, Imagine TV
 Banoo Main Teri Dulhann (2008-2009) as Pradhanji 
 Baba Aiso Varr Dhoondo (2010-2012) as Rupesh Chauhan, Imagine TV
 Jhansi Ki Rani (2009 -2011) as Moropant Tambe (father of Rani Lakshmibai), Zee TV
 Unch Majha Jhoka (2012), Zee Marathi
 Devon Ke Dev...Mahadev / Siya Ke Ram (2011–2014) / 2016 as sage Narada, Life OK/Star Plus
 Asava Sundar Swapnancha Bangala (2013–2015) as Girish Mohite-Patil, ETV Marathi
 Bandhan Saat Janamon Ka as Trilok Agarwal
 Chakravartin Ashoka Samrat(2015) as Amatya Ugrasen
 Bharat Ka Veer Putra – Maharana Pratap(2015) as Tulsidas
 Kahani Hamari... Dil Dosti Deewanepan Ki as Mr.Vadhera
 Brahmarakshas as Nalin Shrivastav (Rishabh's foster father)
Radha Prem Rangi Rangali as Madavrao Nimbalkar (Radha's father)
Chandrakanta (Life OK) as Pandit Jagannath (2017)
Shakti - Astitva Ke Ehsaas Ki(2018) as Doctor who treats Soumya and Harman after they lose their memory 
 Ghum Hai Kisikey Pyaar Meiin as Ninad Chavan: Virat's father (2020–present)

References

External links
 

Marathi-language singers
Living people
Indian male television actors
Marathi actors
Indian male stage actors
Male actors in Marathi theatre
Year of birth missing (living people)